Infinity is the debut studio album of din fiv, released in 1995 by Sinless Records. The album was re-issued by Metropolis Records on compact disc in June 1996 and again as music downloads in 2009 and 2019.

Track listing

Personnel
Adapted from the Infinity liner notes.

din_fiv
 David Din (as Da5id Din) – vocals, recording, instruments, design

Production and design
 Susan Baltozer – cover art, illustrations, photography
 Informatik – mastering
 Shane Murray – cover art, illustrations, photography
 Dave Sherman – cover art, illustrations

Release history

References

External links 
 
  Infinity at Bandcamp

1995 debut albums
Din fiv albums
Metropolis Records albums